Lee Si-young (born 21 April 1997) is a South Korean footballer currently playing as a defender for Seongnam.

Club career 
On 22 December 2022, Lee Si-young is joined FC Seoul.

Career statistics

Club

References

External links 
 

1997 births
Living people
South Korean footballers
Association football defenders
K League 2 players
Seongnam FC players
Gwangju FC players
Footballers at the 2018 Asian Games
Asian Games medalists in football
Asian Games gold medalists for South Korea
Medalists at the 2018 Asian Games
South Korea under-23 international footballers